Orono Por Muang Ubon (born January 14, 1973, in Ubon Ratchathani) is a Thai former Muay Thai fighter.

Biography and career

Orono started Muay Thai at 10 in the Kiatkamchai camp. At 15 he joined the Por Muang Ubon gym in his native Ubon Ratchathani Province to start his Bangkok career, training alongside other notable fighters such as Nungubon Sitlerchai and Nuengtrakarn Por Muang Ubon. His ring name was given to him by a trainer who thought he had a similar face as the boxing champion Rafael Orono who came to compete for a world title in Thailand in 1983 and 1985.

Orono rapidly made a name for himself in Bangkok, fighting for the Songchai promotion. He was recognized for his southpaw style and ability to endure punishment. This style led him to put on very entertaining fights, some of them awarded "Fight of the Year" by Muay Thai institutions such as the Lumpinee Stadium or the Sports Writer Association of Thailand. The latter also designated him as "Fighter of the year" in 1994.

In the early 2010s Orono became a trainer at various Muay Thai camps including 13 Coins Resort. He kept taking fights until 2017.

Titles and honours
Lumpinee Stadium
 1994 Lumpinee Stadium (135 lbs) champion
 1998 Lumpinee Stadium Fight of the Year (vs. Sakmongkol Sithchuchok)
International World MuayThai 
 IWM Junior Welterweight Champion
Sports Writers Association of Thailand
 1994 Fighter of the year
 1995 Fight of the year (vs. Pairot Vor.Walapon)
 1998 Fight of the year (vs. Sakmongkol Sithchuchok)

Fight record

|-  style="background:#fbb;"
| 2017-12-22 ||Loss ||align=left| Erhan Güngör || Muay Xtreme  ||Bangkok, Thailand || Decision || 3|| 3:00
|-  style="background:#cfc;"
| 2017-08-11 || Win ||align=left| Rotnarong Daopadriew || Lumpinee Stadium  ||Bangkok, Thailand || Decision || 5|| 3:00
|-  style="background:#fbb;"
| 2013-09-12 || Loss ||align=left| Behzad Rafigh Doust || Siam Sport TV (13 Coins Stadium ) ||Bangkok, Thailand || Decision || 5||3:00
|-  style="background:#cfc;"
| 2013-07-09 || Win ||align=left| Vlad Malko ||  ||Thailand || TKO (Knees & Elbow) || 4||
|-  bgcolor="#fbb"
| 2013-05-12 || Loss ||align=left| Danny Edwards || Rajadamnern Stadium || Bangkok, Thailand || Decision || 5 || 3:00
|-  style="background:#fbb;"
| 2009-12-05 || Loss ||align=left| Djimé Coulibaly || King's Birthday || Bangkok, Thailand || KO || 4 ||
|-  bgcolor="#fbb"
| 2007- || Loss ||align=left| Soren Monkongtong || Channel 7 Stadium || Bangkok, Thailand || Decision || 5 || 3:00
|-  bgcolor="#fbb"
| 2007-02-02 || Loss||align=left| Kit Sitpholek || Thepprasit Stadium || Pattaya, Thailand || Decision  || 5 || 3:00
|-  bgcolor="#fbb"
| 2005-09-09 || Loss ||align=left| Ryuji Goto || Xplosion 11: Night Of Champions || Hong Kong || Decision || 5 || 3:00
|-  bgcolor="#cfc"
| 2004- || Win ||align=left| Ying Yai || ||  Thailand || KO || ||
|-  bgcolor="#fbb"
| 2002-08-19 || Loss ||align=left| Farid Villaume || Queen's Birthday event || Sukhothai Province, Thailand || Decision || 5 || 3:00 
|-
! style=background:white colspan=9 |
|-  bgcolor="#fbb"
| 2002-04-13 || Loss ||align=left| Jean-Charles Skarbowsky || Songkran : New year Celebration || Nakhon Ratchasima, Thailand || Decision || 5 || 3:00
|-  bgcolor="#c5d2ea"
| 2002-03-04 || Draw ||align=left| Jean-Charles Skarbowsky || Rajadamnern Stadium || Bangkok, Thailand || Decision || 5 || 3:00
|-  bgcolor="#fbb"
| 2002-01-00 || Loss ||align=left| Jean-Charles Skarbowsky ||  || Udon Thani, Thailand || TKO (Ref stop) || 3 ||
|-  bgcolor="#cfc"
| 2001-05-20 || Win||align=left| Ryuji Goto ||  MAJKF || Tokyo, Japan || Decision (Majority) || 5 || 3:00
|-  bgcolor="#fbb"
| 2001-04-01 || Loss ||align=left| Duan Esarn Kiatsarika || Ngamwongwan Mall || Nonthaburi, Thailand || Decision|| 5 || 3:00
|-  bgcolor="#cfc"
| ? || Win ||align=left| Rodtang War.Tweekeat ||  || Thailand || Decision  || 5 || 3:00
|-  style="background:#fbb;"
| 2000-12-05 || Loss ||align=left| John Wayne Parr || Thai King's Birthday Event "Kings Cup" || Sanam Luang, Thailand || Decision (unanimous) || 5 || 3:00
|-
! style=background:white colspan=9 |
|-  bgcolor="#fbb"
| 2000-10-14 || Loss||align=left| Suriya Sor.Ploenchit || Lumpinee Stadium || Bangkok, Thailand || Decision  || 5 || 3:00
|-  bgcolor="#cfc"
| 2000-09-24 || Win||align=left| Kunihide Anose|| NJKF Millenium Wars 8 || Tokyo, Japan || Decision (Unanimous) || 5 || 3:00
|-  bgcolor="#fbb"
| 2000- || Loss ||align=left| Morad Sari ||   || Las Vegas, USA || Decision  || 5 || 3:00
|-
! style=background:white colspan=9 |
|-  bgcolor="#fbb"
| 2000- || Loss||align=left| Kaolan Kaovichit || Lumpinee Stadium || Bangkok, Thailand || Decision  || 5 || 3:00
|-  bgcolor="#cfc"
| 2000-01-29 || Win ||align=left| Stéphane Nikiéma ||  NJKF Millenium Wars 1 || Tokyo, Japan || Decision (Split) || 5 ||3:00 
|-
! style=background:white colspan=9 |
|-  bgcolor="#cfc"
| 1999-12-05 || Win ||align=left| Morad Sari ||  King's Birthday || Bangkok, Thailand || Decision  || 5 || 3:00
|-  style="background:#fbb;"
| 1999-|| Loss||align=left| Somchai Sor.Nantana || Lumpinee Stadium  || Bangkok, Thailand || Decision || 5 || 3:00
|- style="background:#cfc;"
| 1999-01-02 || Win ||align=left| Therdkiat Kiatrungroj || Lumpinee Stadium || Bangkok, Thailand  || Decision || 5 || 3:00
|-  bgcolor="#cfc"
| 1998-12-05 || Win ||align=left| Hassan Kassrioui ||  King's Birthday || Bangkok, Thailand || KO (knees to the body)||3 ||
|-  style="background:#cfc;"
| 1998-10-24|| Win ||align=left| Somchai Sor.Nantana || Lumpinee Stadium  || Bangkok, Thailand || Decision || 5 || 3:00
|-  style="background:#fbb;"
| 1998-08-28 || Loss ||align=left| Sakmongkol Sithchuchok || Wan Songchai Promotions || Bangkok, Thailand || Decision || 5 || 3:00
|-  style="background:#fbb;"
| 1998-07-19 || Loss ||align=left| Sakmongkol Sithchuchok || ITV  || Chachoengsao, Thailand || Decision || 5 || 3:00
|-  style="background:#c5d2ea;"
| 1998-06-27 || Draw ||align=left| Sakmongkol Sithchuchok || Lumpinee Stadium || Bangkok, Thailand || Decision || 5 || 3:00
|-  style="background:#cfc;"
| 1998-05-02|| Win ||align=left| Dejpitak Sityodtong || Lumpinee Stadium  || Bangkok, Thailand || Decision || 5 || 3:00
|-  style="background:#fbb;"
| 1998-03-21 || Loss ||align=left| Sakmongkol Sithchuchok || Lumpinee Stadium || Bangkok, Thailand || Decision || 5 || 3:00
|-  style="background:#cfc;"
| 1998-03-03 || Win ||align=left| Angkarndej Por.Paoin || Lumpinee Stadium || Bangkok, Thailand || Decision || 5 || 3:00
|-  bgcolor="#fbb"
| 1998-||Loss ||align=left| Dany Bill ||   || Paris, France || Decision (Unanimous) || 5 || 3:00
|-  bgcolor="#fbb"
| 1997-12-05 ||Loss ||align=left| Dany Bill ||  King's Birthday || Bangkok, Thailand || Decision (Unanimous) || 5 || 3:00
|-  style="background:#cfc;"
| 1997-10-11|| Win ||align=left| Kongpatapee Sor Sumalee || Lumpinee Stadium  || Bangkok, Thailand || Decision || 5 || 3:00
|-  style="background:#fbb;"
| 1997-|| Loss ||align=left| Kaoponglek Luksurathum || Lumpinee Stadium  || Bangkok, Thailand || TKO (Doctor Stoppage)|| 4 ||
|-  style="background:#cfc;"
| 1997-07-|| Win ||align=left| Nuathoranee Thongracha || Lumpinee Stadium  || Bangkok, Thailand || Decision || 5 || 3:00
|-  style="background:#cfc;"
| 1997-07-06 || Win ||align=left| John Wayne Parr || Chachoengsao || Bangkok, Thailand || TKO (doctor stoppage) || 2 ||
|-  bgcolor="#fbb"
| 1997-04-20 || Loss ||align=left| Hassan Ettaki ||  || Amsterdam, Netherlands || Decision || 5 || 3:00
|- style="background:#fbb;"
| ? || Loss ||align=left| Rayen Simson ||  ||  Thailand  || Decision || 5 || 3:00
|-  style="background:#c5d2ea;"
| 1996-10-11 || Draw||align=left| Sangtiennoi Sor.Rungroj || Lumpinee Stadium || Bangkok, Thailand || Decision  || 5 || 3:00
|-
! style=background:white colspan=9 |
|-  style="background:#cfc;"
| ?|| Win ||align=left| Saenchai Kiatworawut|| Lumpinee Stadium  || Bangkok, Thailand || Decision || 5 || 3:00
|- style="background:#fbb;"
| 1996- || Loss ||align=left| Therdkiat Sitthepitak || Lumpinee Stadium || Bangkok, Thailand  || Decision || 5 || 3:00
|-  bgcolor="#cfc"
| ? || Win ||align=left| Coban Lookchaomaesaitong ||  || Thailand || Decision  || 5 || 3:00
|-  style="background:#cfc;"
| 1995-04-28|| Win ||align=left| Pairot Wor.Wolapon || Lumpinee Stadium  || Bangkok, Thailand || KO (throw) || 4 ||
|-  style="background:#cfc;"
| 1995-04-08 || Win ||align=left| Ramon Dekkers || || Bangkok, Thailand || Decision  || 5 || 3:00
|-  style="background:#cfc;"
| 1995-03-28 || Win||align=left| Jongsanan Fairtex || Lumpinee Stadium || Bangkok, Thailand || Decision  || 5 || 3:00
|-
! style=background:white colspan=9 |
|- style="background:#cfc;"
| 1995-02-28 || Win ||align=left| Namkabuan Nongkeepahuyuth || Lumpinee Stadium || Bangkok, Thailand  || Decision || 5 || 3:00
|- style="background:#fbb;"
| 1995-01-31 || Loss ||align=left| Therdkiat Sitthepitak || Lumpinee Stadium || Bangkok, Thailand  || Decision || 5 || 3:00
|-  style="background:#cfc;"
| 1994-12-24 || Win||align=left| Pairot Wor.Wolapon || Lumpinee Stadium || Bangkok, Thailand || Decision  || 5 || 3:00
|-
! style=background:white colspan=9 |
|-  style="background:#c5d2ea;"
| 1994-10-24|| No Contest ||align=left| Pairot Wor.Wolapon || Rajadamnern Stadium  || Bangkok, Thailand ||  || 5 ||3:00 
|-
! style=background:white colspan=9 |
|-  style="background:#cfc;"
| 1994-09- || Win||align=left| Namphon Nongkee Pahuyuth || Lumpinee Stadium || Bangkok, Thailand || Decision || 5 || 3:00
|-  style="background:#fbb;"
| 1994-08- || Loss||align=left| Pomphet Naratreekul ||  || Trang province, Thailand || Decision || 5 || 3:00  
|-  style="background:#cfc;"
| 1994-07- || Win||align=left| Nuathoranee Thongracha || Lumpinee Stadium || Bangkok, Thailand || Decision || 5 || 3:00  
|-  style="background:#cfc;"
| 1994-07-02|| Win ||align=left| Sangtiennoi Sor.Rungroj || Lumpinee Stadium  || Bangkok, Thailand || TKO (Shoulder dislocation)|| 3 ||
|-  style="background:#cfc;"
| 1994-06-11 || Win||align=left| Pairot Wor.Wolapon || Lumpinee Stadium || Bangkok, Thailand || Decision || 5 || 3:00  
|-  style="background:#cfc;"
| 1994-04- || Win ||align=left| Panomrunglek Chor Sawat || Lumpinee Stadium || Bangkok, Thailand || Decision|| 5 ||3:00
|-  style="background:#cfc;"
| 1994-03-14 || Win ||align=left| Jaroenthong Kiatbanchong || Rajadamnern Stadium || Bangkok, Thailand || Decision|| 5 ||3:00
|-  style="background:#cfc;"
| 1994-02-15 || Win||align=left| Cherry Sor Wanich || Lumpinee Stadium || Bangkok, Thailand || Decision || 5 || 3:00
|-  style="background:#cfc;"
| 1994-01-|| Win||align=left| Chodchoi Chuchokchai  || Lumpinee Stadium || Bangkok, Thailand || Decision || 5 || 3:00
|-  style="background:#fbb;"
| 1993-12-23 || Loss ||align=left| Namphon Nongkee Pahuyuth || Lumpinee Stadium || Bangkok, Thailand || Decision || 5 || 3:00
|-  style="background:#fbb;"
| 1993-10-30 || Loss||align=left| Petchdam Sityodthong || Lumpinee Stadium || Bangkok, Thailand || Decision  || 5 || 3:00
|-
! style=background:white colspan=9 |
|-  style="background:#cfc;"
| 1993-?|| Win|| align=left| Prabseuklek Sitnarong || Sanam Luang || Bangkok, Thailand || Decision || 5 || 3:00
|-  style="background:#fbb;"
| 1993-08-31|| Loss ||align=left| Sangtiennoi Sor.Rungroj || Lumpinee Stadium || Bangkok, Thailand || Decision || 5 || 3:00
|-  style="background:#cfc;"
| 1993-07-27|| Win|| align=left| Sangtiennoi Sor.Rungroj || Lumpinee Stadium || Bangkok, Thailand || Decision || 5 || 3:00
|-  style="background:#fbb;"
| 1993-06-25|| Loss ||align=left| Chodchoi Chuchokchai  || Lumpinee Stadium || Bangkok, Thailand || Decision || 5 || 3:00
|-  style="background:#fbb;"
| 1993-05-04|| Loss|| align=left| Den Muangsurin || Lumpinee Stadium || Bangkok, Thailand || Decision || 5 || 3:00
|-  style="background:#fbb;"
| 1993-04-22|| Loss ||align=left| Chodchoi Chuchokchai  || Lumpinee Stadium || Bangkok, Thailand || Decision || 5 || 3:00
|-  style="background:#fbb;"
| 1993-04-06 || Loss ||align=left| Pairot Wor.Wolapon || Lumpinee Stadium || Bangkok, Thailand || Decision || 5 || 3:00
|-  style="background:#cfc;"
| ? || Win|| align=left| Panomrunglek Chor.Sawat || Lumpinee Stadium || Bangkok, Thailand || Decision || 5 || 3:00
|-  style="background:#fbb;"
| 1993-01-08 || Loss ||align=left| Cherry Sor Wanich || Lumpinee Stadium || Bangkok, Thailand || Decision || 5 || 3:00
|-  style="background:#cfc;"
| ? || Win|| align=left| Den Muangsurin || Lumpinee Stadium || Bangkok, Thailand || Decision || 5 || 3:00
|-  style="background:#cfc;"
| 1992-|| Win|| align=left| Jirasak Por Pongsawang || Lumpinee Stadium || Bangkok, Thailand || Decision || 5 || 3:00
|-  style="background:#fbb;"
| 1992-10-23 || Loss ||align=left| Chandet Sor Prantalay || Lumpinee Stadium || Bangkok, Thailand || Decision || 5 || 3:00
|-  style="background:#fbb;"
| 1992-09-25 || Loss ||align=left| Chanchai Sor Tamarangsri ||  || Bangkok, Thailand || Decision  || 5 || 3:00
|-  style="background:#fbb;"
| 1992-07-21 || Loss ||align=left| Sakmongkol Sithchuchok || Lumpinee Stadium || Bangkok, Thailand || Decision  || 5 || 3:00
|-  style="background:#cfc;"
| 1992-04-26 || Win ||align=left| Ramon Dekkers ||  || Samut Prakan, Thailand || Decision  || 5 || 3:00
|-  style="background:#fbb;"
| 1992-02-21 || Loss ||align=left| Cherry Sor Wanich || Lumpinee Stadium || Bangkok, Thailand || Decision || 5 ||3:00
|-  style="background:#cfc;"
| 1992-01-21|| Win|| align=left| Jirasak Por Pongsawang || Lumpinee Stadium || Bangkok, Thailand || Decision || 5 || 3:00
|-  style="background:#cfc;"
| 1991-12-27 || Win ||align=left| Prabphairi Phrabrama || Lumpinee Stadium || Bangkok, Thailand || Decision  || 5 || 3:00
|-  style="background:#fbb;"
| 1991-09-24 || Loss ||align=left| Dejsak Sakpradu || Lumpinee Stadium || Bangkok, Thailand || Decision  || 5 || 3:00
|-  bgcolor="#fbb"
| 1991-05-25|| Loss ||align=left| Tanooin Chor.Cheuchart ||Lumpinee Stadium || Bangkok, Thailand ||  Decision || 5 || 3:00
|-  bgcolor="#fbb"
| 1991-04-27|| Loss ||align=left| Tanooin Chor.Cheuchart ||Lumpinee Stadium || Bangkok, Thailand ||  Decision || 5 || 3:00
|-  bgcolor="#fbb"
| 1991-03-05|| Loss ||align=left| Samransak Muangsurin ||Lumpinee Stadium || Bangkok, Thailand ||  Decision || 5 || 3:00
|-  bgcolor="#fbb"
| 1991-02-09|| Loss ||align=left| Tanooin Chor.Cheuchart ||Lumpinee Stadium || Bangkok, Thailand ||  Decision || 5 || 3:00
|-  bgcolor="#fbb"
| 1991-01-21|| Loss ||align=left| Rittichai Lookchaomaesaitong ||Lumpinee Stadium || Bangkok, Thailand ||  Decision || 5 || 3:00
|-  style="background:#cfc;"
| 1990 || Win ||align=left| Michael Liewfat ||  ||  England || KO (Left Elbow)  ||3  ||
|-  style="background:#cfc;"
| 1990-11-20 || Win||align=left| Panphet Muagnsurin || Lumpinee Stadium || Bangkok, Thailand || Decision  || 5 || 3:00
|-  style="background:#fbb;"
| 1990-10-12 || Loss ||align=left| Langsuan Panyuthaphum || Lumpinee Stadium || Bangkok, Thailand || Decision || 5 ||3:00
|-  style="background:#cfc;"
| 1990-09-25 || Win ||align=left| Kompayak Singmanee || Lumpinee Stadium || Bangkok, Thailand || Decision  || 5 || 3:00
|-  style="background:#cfc;"
| 1990-08-31 || Win ||align=left| Paruhatlek Sitchunthong || Lumpinee Stadium || Bangkok, Thailand || Decision  || 5 || 3:00

|-  style="background:#cfc;"
| 1990-08- || Win||align=left| Pongsiri Por Ruamrudee || Rajadamnern Stadium || Bangkok, Thailand || Decision  || 5 || 3:00
|-  style="background:#cfc;"
| 1990-07-20 || Win||align=left| Duangsompong Tor.Sitthichai || Lumpinee Stadium || Bangkok, Thailand || Decision  || 5 || 3:00
|-  style="background:#fbb;"
| 1990-05-15 || Loss ||align=left| Chandet Sor Prantalay || Lumpinee Stadium || Bangkok, Thailand || Decision || 5 || 3:00
|-  style="background:#cfc;"
| 1990-04-24 || Win ||align=left| Pornnimit Muanglopburi || Lumpinee Stadium || Bangkok, Thailand || Decision || 5 || 3:00
|-  style="background:#cfc;"
| 1990-03-30 || Win||align=left| Pornsak Muagnsurin || Lumpinee Stadium || Bangkok, Thailand || Decision  || 5 || 3:00

|-  style="background:#cfc;"
| 1989-11-03 || Win ||align=left| Krirkchai Sor.Kettalingchan || Lumpinee Stadium || Bangkok, Thailand || Decision  || 5 || 3:00

|-  style="background:#cfc;"
| 1989-10-06 || Win ||align=left| Kongkiat Sor.Rangsanpanich || Lumpinee Stadium || Bangkok, Thailand || Decision  || 5 || 3:00

|-  style="background:#fbb;"
| 1989-09-18 || Loss ||align=left| Krirkchai Sor.Kettalingchan || Rajadamnern Stadium || Bangkok, Thailand || Decision  || 5 || 3:00
|-  style="background:#fbb;"
| 1989-06-13 || Loss||align=left| Sakmongkol Sithchuchok || Lumpinee Stadium || Bangkok, Thailand || Decision  || 5 || 3:00
|-  style="background:#cfc;"
| 1989-05-15 || Win||align=left| Sakmongkol Sithchuchok || Rajadamnern Stadium || Bangkok, Thailand || Decision  || 5 || 3:00
|-  style="background:#fbb;"
| 1989-03-28 || Loss||align=left| Playchumphon Sor Prantalay || Lumpinee Stadium || Bangkok, Thailand || Decision  || 5 || 3:00
|-  style="background:#cfc;"
| 1989-03-04 || Win ||align=left| Tukatathong Por Pongsawang || Lumpinee Stadium || Bangkok, Thailand || Decision  || 5 || 3:00
|-  style="background:#cfc;"
| 1989-02-17 || Win ||align=left| Pichai Wor.Walapon || Lumpinee Stadium || Bangkok, Thailand || Decision  || 5 || 3:00
|-  style="background:#cfc;"
| 1988-12-16 || Win ||align=left| Jaroensap Kiatbanchong || Lumpinee Stadium || Bangkok, Thailand || Decision  || 5 || 3:00
|-
| colspan=9 | Legend:

References

1973 births
Living people
Orono Por Muang Ubon
Orono Por Muang Ubon
Muay Thai trainers